The National Assembly of the Federal Republic of Nigeria is a bicameral legislature established under section 4 of the Nigerian Constitution. It consists of a Senate with 109 members and a 360-member House of Representatives. The body, modeled after the federal Congress of the United States, is supposed to guarantee equal representation with 3 senators to each 36 states irrespective of size in the Senate plus 1 senator representing the Federal Capital Territory and single-member district, plurality voting in the House of Representatives. The National Assembly, like many other organs of the Nigerian federal government, is based in Abuja in the Federal Capital Territory.

Leadership
The Senate is chaired by the president of the Nigerian Senate, the first of whom was Nnamdi Azikiwe, who stepped down from the job to become the country's first head of state. The House is chaired by the speaker of the House of Representatives. At any joint session of the Assembly, the president of the Senate presides and in their absence the speaker of the House presides.

Functions
The Assembly has broad oversight functions and is empowered to establish committees of its members to scrutinise bills and the conduct of government officials. Since the restoration of democratic rule in 1999, the Assembly has been said to be a "learning process" that has witnessed the election and removal of several presidents of the Senate, allegations of corruption, slow passage of private member's bills and the creation of ineffective committees to satisfy numerous interests.

In spite of a more than two-thirds majority control of the Assembly by the then ruling Peoples Democratic Party (PDP), the PDP government led by Goodluck Jonathan and the Assembly have been known more for their disagreements than for their cooperation. Jonathan has been accused of being slow to implement policy. Many bills, some from as long ago as 2007, are still awaiting the president's assent. While the Assembly has made strong and often popular efforts to assert its authority and independence against the executive, it is still viewed generally in a negative light by the media and many of the Nigerian people. The Assembly sits for a period of at most four years, after which time the president is required to dissolve it and call a new Assembly into the session.

The Senate has the unique power to impeach judges and other high officials of the executive, including the federal auditor-general and the members of the electoral and revenue commissions. This power is, however, subject to a prior request by the president. The Senate also confirms the president's nomination of senior diplomats, members of the federal cabinet, federal judicial appointments, and independent federal commissions.

Before any bill may become law, it must be agreed to by both the House and the Senate, and receive the president's assent. Should the president delay or refuse assent (veto) the bill, the Assembly may pass the law by two-thirds of both chambers and overrule the veto and the president's consent will not be required. The present Assembly has not hidden its preparedness to overrule the executive where they disagree.

Support
The National Institute for Legislative Studies (NILS) is an organ of the National Assembly established by an Act of Parliament. Former President Jonathan signed into law the National Institute for Legislative Studies Act 2011 on 2 March 2011 following the passage of the same by the Senate and the House of Representatives.  NILS builds on the successes of the Policy Analysis and Research Project, established in 2003 as a capacity building institution of the National Assembly with the financial support of the African Capacity Building Foundation. NILS has as its core objectives to provide quality academic and professional research, policy analysis, training, documentation and advocacy on democratic governance and legislative practice and procedures. The functions of NILS are similar to the services offered to the US Congress by Congressional Research Service, Congressional Budget Office, and Library of Congress, only on a lesser scale as the institute was just established. The institute has been renamed the National Institute for Legislative and Democratic Studies, following the amendment to the act establishing it.

National Assembly State Delegations

Abia
Adamawa
Akwa Ibom
Anambra
Bauchi
Bayelsa
Benue
Borno
Cross River
Delta
Ebonyi
Edo
Ekiti
Enugu
Gombe
Imo
Jigawa
Kaduna
Kano
Katsina
Kebbi
Kogi
Kwara
Lagos
Nasarawa
Niger
Ogun
Ondo
Osun
Oyo
Plateau
Rivers
Sokoto
Taraba
Yobe
Zamfara
FCT

Women in the National Assembly 
Currently, there are a total of 21 women serving in the National Assembly, 8 in the Senate and 13 in the House of Representatives. In total, women make up around 4.47% percent of the National Assembly. The first and only female to serve as the speaker of the Nigerian House of Representatives was Patricia Etteh who served a four-month term from June to October 2007. The only female to have held the position of governor in Nigerian history was Dame Virginia Ngozi Etiaba who held the office of governor of Anambra State for three months after the previous governor was impeached for alleged gross misconduct.

In Nigeria, men and women have an equal right to participate in public office, which is guaranteed to them by the constitution. Section 40 of the 1999 Constitution of the Federal Republic of Nigeria bestows upon Nigerian citizens the right to belong to any political party, trade union or any other association for the protection of his interests. Many initiatives have been taken by the Nigerian government to promote the participation of women in politics and public service. In the 2000 National Policy on Women, the Nigerian government pledged to ensure that women participate in politics equally to men, implementing an affirmative action quota of 30% increase in participation. In the 2003 elections, some parties waived nomination fees for women in order to lower the barriers to participation.  There are many civil society groups that focus on the interests of women who want to participate in politics. The Forum of Nigerian Women in Politics is an influential group that operates with the goal of empowering women. They have requested that the Nigerian government yield 30% female representation in government appointments.

Women in Nigeria face many barriers to political participation. These include cultural practices, threat of intimidation or violence, high cost of election, inadequacy of willing and educated women, and issues regarding indigeneity. Women who are married outside their constituencies of birth but run for election in the constituencies of their marriage are often marked as non-indigene by the community.

Women face multiple obstacles that limit them in their political participation, and this is has an effect on the amount of women who are represented in government. These obstacles are related to the high cost of politics, which prevents women for standing for positions, as some women are not able to afford the mandatory expression of interest and nomination forms. These forms are required by political parties to run for positions on their platforms in addition to the campaign costs. Women are disproportionately affected by this because there is inadequate access to education for women compared to their male counterparts and poor access to education translates to poor access to gainful employment, unpaid labor, unequal access to inheritance rights, and discrimination - all obstacles that limit the participation of women in politics.

Mercy Ette argues that there has been less participation of women in politics as a result of the influence of the media. She argues that the media has reinforced a patriarchy in politics and has downplayed the participation of women in politics. The failure of political parties to choose women as strong candidates has also contributed greatly to lack of effective participation of women in politics. These women are often given subordinate positions where they are able to change little to nothing or affect decisions in the political society. Despite the challenges faced by women in Nigerian politics, there has been an increasing number of female participation in politics over the years. In 1999 3 women were elected to the senate and 12 to the House of Representatives after two rounds of elections. Later the number of women in senate has gone up to 8 in 2007, but this number later dropped in 2011. The overall national average for women participation is around 6% for elective and appointive positions which is below the West African sub regional average of 15%. Nigeria ranks the 32nd out of the 35 sub Saharan countries when it comes to representation of women in politics. The upcoming 2023 elections is facing similar criticisms, as there are just 6 female aspirants who have joined the presidential race to succeed Muhammadu Buhari.

Gallery

See also
 List of committees of the National Assembly of Nigeria
 List of legislatures by country
 Nigerian First Republic (1963-1966)
 Nigerian Second Republic (1979-1983)
 Nigerian Third Republic (1993)
 Nigerian Fourth Republic (1999–present)
 Elections in Nigeria
 Politics of Nigeria
 Women members of National Assembly (Nigeria)

References

External links
 Official website of the Nigerian National Assembly
 Assemblyonline news on the National Assembly
 Official People and Legislature Information Interchange

 
Nigeria
Government of Nigeria
Politics of Nigeria
Nigeria